Labyrinth is the fourth full-length album, released by Norwegian thrash metal band Equinox. It was released in 1994.

Track listing

1994 albums
Equinox (thrash metal band) albums